Frans Gustaf Johansson Lindstrand (11 February 1883 – 26 March 1959) was a Swedish wrestler. He competed in the Greco-Roman heavyweight event at the 1912 Summer Olympics, but was eliminated in the third bout.

References

External links
 

1883 births
1959 deaths
Olympic wrestlers of Sweden
Wrestlers at the 1912 Summer Olympics
Swedish male sport wrestlers
People from Älmhult Municipality
Sportspeople from Kronoberg County